Pat Fitzsimmons (born 4 December 1943) is an Irish boxer. He competed in the men's featherweight event at the 1964 Summer Olympics.

References

1943 births
Living people
Irish male boxers
Olympic boxers of Ireland
Boxers at the 1964 Summer Olympics
Place of birth missing (living people)
Featherweight boxers